Johnathan Stove (born December 23, 1995) is an American basketball player for Hapoel Galil Elyon of the Israeli Basketball Premier League. He plays the guard position. He played college basketball for the University of Louisiana at Lafayette.

Early life
Stove was born in Baton Rouge, Louisiana, to Sanora and Benjamin Stove.

High school
Playing for Christian Life Academy ('14) in Baton Rouge as a junior, he averaged 19.8 points.  He earned first all-state honors, and was named to both the state Class A team and to the 11-man all-classes team by the Louisiana High School Basketball Coaches Association.

As a senior, he averaged 25.9 points, 10.9 rebounds 3.2 assists, 2.9 steals, and 2.0 blocks per game. He was ranked the No. 3 player in the state by Nola.com, and named Class 1A MVP by the 
Louisiana Sports Writers Association.

College
In 2014-15 as a freshman for the University of Louisiana at Lafayette ('18) where he majored in business management, playing guard for the Louisiana Ragin' Cajuns he averaged 5.4 points, 2.1 rebounds, and 1.8 assists per game while shooting .496 from the field and .787 from the free throw line.

In 2015-16 he averaged 8.9 points, 3.4 rebounds, and 1.7 assists per game, and shot .447 from the floor and .750 from the free throw line. In 2016-17 as a junior he averaged 9.1 points, 4.1 rebounds, and 1.7 assists per game. He shot .415 from the floor, and .732 (9th in the Sun Belt Conference) from the free throw line.

In 2017-18 as a senior he averaged 10.1 points, 3.0 rebounds, and 1.6 assists per game. He was second among Sun Belt Conference players in free throw percentage (.821), and seventh in two-point field goal percentage (.585).

Professional career
In 2021 he played for KB Vllaznia in the Albanian Basketball Superleague. He averaged 22 points, 10.4 rebounds, and 5.8 assists per game in five games played.

In November 2021 he signed with Hapoel Galil Elyon of the Israeli Basketball Premier League.

References 

1995 births
Living people
American men's basketball players
Basketball players from Baton Rouge, Louisiana
Louisiana Ragin' Cajuns men's basketball players
Hapoel Galil Elyon players
American expatriate basketball people in Israel
American expatriate sportspeople in Albania
Guards (basketball)